The Aircraft Ship Integrated Secure and Traverse (ASIST) system is a shipboard helicopter landing system developed by Canadian company Indal Technologies (now part of US conglomerate Curtiss-Wright). ASIST completed sea trials by July 31, 1992, and production units are in operation with the Chilean Navy, Republic of Singapore Navy, Turkish Navy and United States Navy.

Mode of Operation
The ASIST system employs a sophisticated electro-optic tracking system which detects a laser beacon-equipped helicopter. The system tracks the helicopter and provide real time helicopter position simultaneously via visual cues to the pilot. A computer-controlled rapid securing device will also be driven by the position data to track the helicopter at low hover. Once the system has detected that the helicopter has landed on the deck, the securing device automatically approaches the helicopter and secures it. The securing device and traversing system are then used to align the helicopter with the deck tracks and manoeuvre it into a hangar, all without the need for manned intervention. All ASIST electrical and mechanical systems are modular and are housed in the hangar or below deck level to minimize space and weight requirements.

References

Air traffic control